Grootfontein (named after the nearby hot springs) is a city of 23,793 inhabitants in the Otjozondjupa Region of central Namibia. It is one of the three towns in the Otavi Triangle, situated on the B8 national road that leads from Otavi to the Caprivi Strip.

Overview
The place was known to the Herero under the name Otjivanda. In 1885, 40 Boer families from the north-west of South Africa settled at Grootfontein. Part of the Dorsland trekkers, they were heading towards Angola.  When that territory fell under Portuguese control, they turned back and established the Republic of Upingtonia at Grootfontein.  Abandoned by 1887, it became the headquarters of the South West Africa Company in 1893.

In 1908 the Roman Catholic church established a mission in Grootfontein as the basis of their eventually successful attempt to establish missions in Kavango.

Like all the towns in the Otavi Triangle, Grootfontein is green in summer but drier in winter.  In spring, jacaranda and flamboyant trees bloom in profusion. The town has an old German Schutztruppe fortress from the year 1896, which today houses a museum that expounds on the local history.  The economic mainspring of the area were for many decades the Berg Aukas and Abenab mines to the north east of the town. These produced zinc and vanadium but have since closed.  This is dolomite country and the carbonate deposits in the upper parts of the mine have yielded interesting fossils of simian or pongoid creatures that lived millions of years before modern humans evolved.

Twenty four kilometres west of Grootfontein lies the huge Hoba meteorite.  At over 60 tons, it is the largest known meteorite on Earth, as well as being the largest naturally occurring mass of iron known to exist on the planet's surface.

Economy and infrastructure

Transport

Grootfontein is a railhead on TransNamib, the national railway and transport system. The next station to the west is Otavi. Grootfontein is also home of Namibia's main military base which housed several units of the now departed South African Defence Force. It has an airfield that can handle large transport carriers such as the Hercules C130, as well as commercial passenger aircraft.

Agriculture
Grootfontein Show, an annual agricultural exhibition that takes place since 1911, is the second largest annual entrepreneurial exhibition in the country, after Windhoek Show.

Climate 

Politics
Grootfontein is governed by a municipal council that has seven seats.

The 2015 local authority election was won by Namibia's ruling SWAPO party which gained five seats and 2,019 votes. One seat each went to the Democratic Turnhalle Alliance (DTA, 546 votes) and to the All People's Party (APP, 154 votes). SWAPO also won the 2020 local authority election, obtaining 1,727 votes and gaining four seats. The Independent Patriots for Change (IPC), an opposition party formed in August 2020, obtained 653 votes and gained two seats. The remaining seat went to the Popular Democratic Movement (PDM, the new name of the DTA) with 309 votes.

Education
Previously the German school Regierungsschule Grootfontein was in the town. In 1965 it had 4 teachers and 117 learners and was supported by German government.

Grootfontein is home to four high schools, Grootfontein Secondary School, Otjiwanda High School Friedrich Awaseb Senior Secondary School, and the private school with the name Karstveld Academy, further the primary schools Luiperdheuwel, Kalenga, Makalani, Omulunga and Wilhelm Nortier. The city also hosts a private German language primary school (Deutsche Privatschule Grootfontein - DPG).

Notable people from Grootfontein
Behati Prinsloo – model, best known for working with Victoria's Secret and Wife of Maroon 5 frontman, Adam Levine
Leon Jooste – SWAPO politician and businessman
Hage Geingob – The President of the Republic of Namibia
Lydia Katjita – SWAPO politician and member of the Pan-African Parliament
Hannes Smith – journalist
Inge Zaamwani – businesswoman

External links

 
 Web site of the Alte Fort Museum in the former German Schutztruppe fortress

References

 

Populated places in the Otjozondjupa Region
Cities in Namibia
Capitals of former nations
Populated places founded by Afrikaners
Hot springs of Namibia
Catholic missions in Namibia